Cheng Tin Hung or Zheng Tianxiong (1930–2005) was an influential taijiquan master and the founder of "Wudang taijiquan". He was based in Hong Kong, China, and sometimes attracted controversy for his attitude and approach to the teaching and practice of his martial art. Also known as the "Tai Chi Bodyguard" for his enthusiastic defence of Taijiquan as a martial art, he took part in full contact competitions as a young man and also trained some of his students to do the same during the 1960s, '70s and '80s.

Though closely associated with the Wu school of taijiquan, he founded a separate organisation called the Hong Kong Tai Chi Association (香港太極總會) which is now run by his wife Chan Lai Ping(陳麗平).

Cheng Tin Hung produced a series of books and VCDs on the subject of Taijiquan and was also involved in the production of the 1974 Hong Kong movie called The Shadow Boxer (Shaw Brothers). He appears in the opening scenes and some of his techniques were also used within the fight scenes of the movie proper.

During the 1980s, Cheng Tin Hung travelled to the UK to promote Taijiquan with three of his students, Ian Cameron, Tong Chi Kin and Dan Docherty, who also produced a joint publication with him called Wutan Tai Chi Chuan.

During the 1990s Cheng Tin Hung's taijiquan career slowly drew to a close with the onset of diabetes and its debilitating effects; he finally passed from this world in 2005.

Some career highlights of note

1950: Established the Cheng Tin Hung Tai Chi Academy in Hong Kong
1957: Won the Hong Kong Macau Taiwan boxing competition held in Taiwan
1972: Established the Hong Kong Tai Chi Association
1975: In conjunction with the Hong Kong government, established Taijiquan classes throughout Hong Kong
1980s: started construction of Tai Chi Heights, part retirement home and part Taijiquan resource centre in his hometown in Guangdong, China.

T'ai chi ch'uan lineage tree with Wu-style focus

Notes

References
Profile reference in Chinese
Profile reference in English

1930 births
2005 deaths
Chinese tai chi practitioners
Hong Kong martial artists